Elkhorn Township is a township in Webster County, Iowa, United States.

References

Townships in Webster County, Iowa
Townships in Iowa